Hebdomochondra syrticola is a species of moth of the family Noctuidae. It is found in Turkmenistan and southern Russia.

External links
 Fauna Europaea
 Checklist Russian Heliothinae

Heliothinae